Ada Mee (born 1946) is a German artist based in Heidelberg. She works across various mediums, including painting, lithography, photography.

Life 
Ada Mee was born 1946 in Thuringia and lived in Jena until her escape to the Federal Republic of Germany in 1952. She grew up in Bremen, the Eifel, the Swabian Jura and in Stuttgart, where she graduated from school. She studied architecture in Karlsruhe, finishing as qualified engineer. She currently lives in Heidelberg and is married with one daughter.

Career 

Mee is a member of the Bundesverband Bildender Künstlerinnen und Künstler (German Association of Fine Artists), the Heidelberger Forum für Kunst (Arts Forum of Heidelberg) and the Kunsthöfle Gallery in Stuttgart-Bad Cannstatt.

Painting 
Mee's materials include acrylic paint, watercolour, gouache, pencil, Indian ink on wood, card and various paper types.

Staged photo art 
Mee calls her photo art on canvas as application art – artistic transformation and/or modification of primary structures through painting and/or digital plots. Ada Mee combines painting and her own photographs, forms and designs those on the computer, changes the shapes again, adjusts colours, paints realistic and/or digital until she can identify with her work.

Staged conceptual art 
Heavy opposed intellectual worlds collide in her re-enacted stagings, fantasies mixed with realities which often illustrate the shattering truth. One example is Das Wunder von Puijang (en: The Wonder of Puijang) which shows an infant born while the mother was squatting over a toilet, who slipped into a waste tube and was saved.

Recognition and promotion 
 2013: election for HEISE Kunstpreis 2014
 2009: promotion by Stiftungen Landesbank-Baden-Württemberg, Catalogue: Lithographien vom Stein
 2008: promotion by Stiftungen Landesbank-Baden-Württemberg, Catalogue: Maroc mon amour. 1996, Malerei zur Ausstellung im Presseclub Bonn
 2006: professional recognition “UnFAIRblümt“, Haus der Demokratie und Menschenrechte, Berlin
 2006: art prize of the county Alzey-Worms
 2005: election for the graphical calendar by Johann Kasper Zeus, 2006, city of Kronach

Exhibitions

International and supraregional group exhibitions 
 1993: Everarts gallery, Paris
 1996: Presseclub Bonn, Maroc mon amour
 2002, 1998: Foire Internationale Lac Luxembourg, Salon de Printemps, Letzeburger Artisten Center
 2011, 2008, 2006, 2004, 1999: Wilhelm–Fabry–Museum Hilden
 2013, 2005, 2004, 2003, 2002, 2001, 2000: Mini Print International of Cadaques, Spain
 2000: City Museum Halle an der Saale, Halle und das Salz der Erde
 2000: City Museum Pforzheim, Drogen
 2014, 2006, 2002: Miniatur International Fürstenwalde, Spree
 2004: international Licher photography prize
 2005: Women Museum Bonn
 2005: Museum van Bommeln van Dam, Venlo, Niederlande
 2015, 2007, 2005: Kunstforum Rheinbach '99 e. V., Kunst auf dem Campus
 2007: Castle Museum city of Schwarzenberg, art und figura
 2008: Third Beijing International Art Biennale China, Peking
 2008: Senckenberg Museum, Frankfurt am Main, Senckenberg-Brunnen
 2012: Museum Zündorfer Wehrturm, Cologne
 2014, 2013, 2012, 2009: Marler Kunststern, Marl
 2014, 2013: Internationale Biennale Hamburg

Solo exhibitions (excerpt) 
 1991: Villa Meixner Brühl, collection of the KulturForums Europa, Schicksale
 1992: town hall Heilbronn, Steindrucke
 1993: Mettnau-Radolfzell, Menschen – Landschaften
 1997: Adelfinger Gallery, Lampertheim, Gemalt-Gedruckt-Geformt
 1999: Cas Karlsruhe, Positiv
 2007: Bad Bergzaberner KunstSaison
 2010: Galerie Kunsthöfle, Stuttgart, code 08-21
 2011: 6th Bergzabener KunstSaison at the castle of the dukes of Zweibrücken
 2013: Museum für ostdeutsche und osteuropäische Kunst, Sank Julian
 2015: Galerie Kunsthöfle, Stuttgart, Mensch wer bist du?

Further supraregional exhibitions (excerpt) 
 2015: Inszenierung der Realität, Heidelberger Forum für Kunst
 2015: Sportlich, Heidelberger Forum für Kunst
 2014: Illustrierte Gedichte von Christian-Morgenstern, Werder (Havel)
 2013: Wellen, QQTec, Hilden
 2013: Heimat, Heise-Kunstpreis-Kalender 2014, alte Feuerwache, Dessau
 2012: genug ist genug, Heidelberger Forum für Kunst
 2012: Wertschöpfung, Galerie Kunsthöfle, Stuttgart
 2010: Nachts, Heidelberger Forum für Kunst
 2009: Visionen, 10. Kunstkreuz Berlin-Kreuzberg
 2008: Die Freiheit, die ich meine, 9. KunstKreuz Berlin-Friedrichshain
 2008: SpielArt, Landesausstellung des Bundesverbandes Bildender Künstler
 2008: Zirkus, VIII. Jesteburger Kunstwoche
 2008: Im Namen der Lippischen Rose, Kunst- und Designpreis
 2007: Überzeichnet, Heidelberger Forum für Kunst
 2006: Schaufenster à la Art, Kunstpreis des Landkreises Alzey-Worms
 2006: Die Kunst des Alterns, Caritas Altenhilfe, Berlin
 2006: Bewegung, Dynamik und Kraft, Kunstpreis Wesseling
 2006: wie die sachen oft querre gehen, Kunstpreis der Stadt Augsburg
 2005: Johann Kasper Zeus-Kalender 2006,  Kronach
 2005: Nibelungenlied, AmtsHausGalerie, Stadt Freudenberg
 2004: Grenzfälle, VI. Kunstwoche Jesteburg
 2004: Zeitgenössische bildende Kunst, Salzburg
 2002: Reaktion-Bilder, Hermann Hesse Calw International
 2002: Literarischer Simrock-Freiligrath-Weg, Bad Honnef
 2001: Welde Galerie, Schwetzingen
 2001: Kunst im Burgrafiat, Stadt Alzey
 2000: Jubiläumsbilder, Galerie der Sparkasse Karlsruhe
 2000: Sichtweisen, Öhringer Schloss, Große Kreisstadt Öhringen
 2015, 2014, 2013, 2012, 2011, 2010, 2007: Heidelberger Forum für Kunst

References

External links 
 Website Ada Mee

Further reading 
 Wilhelm-Fabry-Museum Hilden: Dem Gehirn auf der Spur, Denken-Erinnern-Vergessen. Type § Print Hilden, 2011, S. 78, 79.
 Wilhelm-Fabry-Museum Hilden: Schmerz – Bilder vom Menschen. Type § Print Hilden, 2008, S. 10, 11, 108, 109.
 Wilhelm-Fabry-Museum Hilden: Augenblick, verweile doch du bist so schön! Digitaldruck Hilden, 2006, S. 74, 75.
 Wilhelm-Fabry-Museum Hilden: Tischlein deck‘ dich! Digitaldruck Hilden, 2004, S. 78, 79.
 Frauenmuseum Bonn: 15. Kunstmesse. Druck und Verlag Gebrüder Kopp Köln, 2005, S. 37.
 Kulturaustausch Hamburg-Übersee e.V., Galerie Kunststätte am Michel, Hamburg: Internationale Biennale Hamburg: Umwelt im Ökologiediskurs – rund um die Elbe 2012, S. 102, 103.
 Kulturaustausch Hamburg-Übersee e.V., Galerie Kunststätte am Michel, Hamburg: Internationale Biennale Hamburg: Umwelt im Ökologiediskurs-Erneuerbare Energien. Printed in Germany, 2014, S. 94, 95.
 Thomas Münch, Martina Biesenbach: Glück. Frank & Timme, 2014, S. 186.
 Art Direktor Gisela Erdmannsdörfer: ART Stuttgart. Nr.13. 2013, S. 27.
 Editor on Duty Chen Zhenxin: The Album of the third Beijing International Art Biennale China. 2008, S. 64.

Photographers from Baden-Württemberg
German women artists
Living people
1946 births
Artists from Heidelberg